The Louisiana Ragin' Cajuns baseball team is the college baseball team of the University of Louisiana at Lafayette. The Ragin' Cajuns baseball team competes in NCAA Division I in the Sun Belt Conference. They play their home games on campus at M. L. Tigue Moore Field at Russo Park and were coached by head coach Tony Robichaux, until his death on July 3, 2019.  Matt Deggs was named the new head coach on July 17, 2019 and 2020 will mark his first season.

History

Conference membership history
 1903–1947: Independent
 1948–1971: Gulf States Conference
 1972–1982: Southland Conference
 1983–1987: Independent
 1988–1991: American South Conference
 1992–present: Sun Belt Conference

Stadium

Head coaches

NCAA Regional appearances

NCAA Super Regional appearances

NCAA College World Series appearances

Year-by-year results

Record versus opponent

 Last updated at the conclusion of the 2022 season.

Record against Sun Belt

Last updated at the conclusion of the 2022 conference tournament. The Cajuns have yet to play games against conference foes Marshall, James Madison, and Old Dominion.

NCAA tournament appearances
 The Ragin' Cajuns reached the 2000 College World Series and eventually finished tied for 3rd after defeating Clemson but losing out to Stanford before the title game.
 Hosted NCAA Regional in 2000, 2014, and 2016.
 Hosted NCAA Super Regional in 2014.
 Hosted NCAA Regional in 2016
 In all, the Louisiana Ragin Cajuns have had 17 different NCAA Postseason appearances, including the 2015 Houston Regional and the Baton Rouge Super Regional.

Ragin' Cajuns in the Major Leagues
 Jim Holloway
 Jose Alvarez
 Alvin Dark
 Paul Bako
 Scott Dohmann
 Danny Farquhar
 Ron Guidry
 Gary Haught
 Xavier Hernandez
 Jonathan Lucroy
 B. J. Ryan
 Donne Wall
 Chad Beck
 Blake Trahan

Major League Baseball
The Louisiana Ragin Cajuns have had 97 Major League Baseball Draft selections since the draft began in 1965.

See also
 List of NCAA Division I baseball programs

References

External links
 

 
Baseball teams established in 1903
1903 establishments in Louisiana